The 1974 United States Senate election in Maryland was held on November 5, 1974 to elect one of Maryland's members to the United States Senate. Incumbent Republican U.S. Senator  Charles Mathias Jr. won re-election to a second term defeating Baltimore City Councilwoman Barbara Mikulski, who won the Senate election 12 years later for this same seat upon Mathias' retirement.

This election marks the last time either party won a race for Maryland’s Class 3 US Senate seat with less than 60% of the vote.

Background
As a Republican representing heavily Democratic Maryland, Mathias faced a potentially difficult re-election bid for the 1974 election. State Democrats nominated Barbara Mikulski, then a Baltimore City Councilwoman who was well-known to residents in her city as a social activist, but with limited name recognition in the rest of the state. Mathias was renominated by Republicans, fending off a primary election challenge from conservative doctor Ross Pierpont. Pierpont was never a substantial threat to Mathias, whose lack of competition was due in part to fallout from the Watergate scandal.

As an advocate for campaign finance reform, Mathias refused to accept any contribution over $100 to "avoid the curse of big money that has led to so much trouble in the last year". However, he still managed to raise over $250,000, nearly five times Mikulski's total. Ideologically, Mikulski and Mathias agreed on many issues, such as closing tax loopholes and easing taxes on the middle class. On two issues, however, Mathias argued to reform Congress and the U.S. tax system to address inflation and corporate price fixing, contrary to Mikulski. In retrospect, The Washington Post felt the election was "an intelligent discussion of state, national, and foreign affairs by two smart, well-informed people".

General election

Candidates
Barbara A. Mikulski (D), Baltimore City Councilwoman
Charles McCurdy Mathias, Jr. (R), incumbent U.S. Senator

Results

See also 
 United States Senate elections, 1974 and 1975

References 

Maryland
1974
United States Senate